Moremore Nunataks is a nunatak group,  long, immediately west of McSaveney Spur and Mount Bastion on the plateau of the Willett Range in Victoria Land.  Moremore is a Māori word meaning "bald head", and was applied descriptively to these nunataks in 2005 by the New Zealand Geographic Board.

References

Mountains of Victoria Land
Willett Range